Masato (written: , , , , , , ,  or ) is a masculine Japanese given name. Notable people with the name include:

Masato (kickboxer) (born 1979), Japanese former welterweight kickboxer, won K-1 WORLD MAX kickboxing tournament in 2003, 2008
Masato Amada (born 1974), Japanese voice actor
, Japanese actor
Masato Hagiwara (born 1971), Japanese actor
Masato Harada (born 1949), Japanese film director and actor
Masato Hatanaka (born 1975), Japanese musician
Masato Hayakawa (born 1986), Japanese singer and musician
Masato Ichishiki (born 1971), author of the SD Gundam comics
, Japanese film director and screenwriter
, Japanese anime director and screenwriter
, Japanese game developer and scenario writer
Masato Kawabata (born 1977), professional drifting driver
Masato Kitera, Japanese diplomat
Masato Kurogi (born 1989), Japanese football player for Cerezo Osaka
, Japanese judoka
Masato Morishige (born 1987), Japanese football player for F.C. Tokyo
Masato Nakamura (born 1958), member of the band Dreams Come True
, Japanese baseball player
Masato Nagai a Japanese anime singer
, Japanese footballer
, Japanese footballer
Masato Sakai (born 1973), Japanese actor
, Japanese footballer
, Japanese weightlifter
, Japanese sailor
, Japanese baseball player
Masato Yokoyama (born 1964), perpetrator of the Sarin gas attack on the Tokyo subway
Masato Yoshii (born 1965), Japanese professional baseball player

Fictional characters
Masato (Pokémon), known in English as Max, a character in Pokémon and Ash & Pikachu
Masato Inohara, a character in Little Busters!
Masato Jin from Tokumei Sentai Go-Busters
Masato Kusaka of Kamen Rider 555
Masato Mishima of Kamen Rider Kabuto
Masato Sanjouin from Sailor Moon
Masato Wakamatsu of Miyuki
Masato Yamanobe, a character in the manga Phoenix (Hi no Tori)
 Masato Hijirikawa, a character from the Uta no Prince-sama series.
 Masato Kageura, a character in the manga World Trigger.

See also
Masato, Peruvian Amazonian regional variation of the fermented beverage chicha

Japanese masculine given names